Le Train is a French railway company. Founded in 2020, the company aims to operate the first private high-speed rail service in France. In December 2022, Le Train received its operating license, and in 2023 signed a €300m contract with Spanish train manufacturer Talgo to deliver 10 Avril single-deck high-speed trains.

References 

Railway companies of France
Railway companies established in 2020
French brands
Rail transport in France

de:Le_Train
es:Le_Train